Tokyo Bay NK Hall was an indoor sporting arena located at the Tokyo Disney Resort in Urayasu, Chiba, in Japan. It opened in 1988, closed in 2005 and was demolished in 2015 to make way for Toy Story Hotel. The capacity of the arena was 7,000 people. It hosted local sporting events and concerts that required a smaller facility than Ariake Coliseum.

Past major events
1993 Japan Music Awards on November 16, 1993.
Venue for the UFC 23 event.
Held the first ever SASUKE competition in 1997.

Urayasu, Chiba
Defunct indoor arenas in Japan
Defunct sports venues in Japan
Sports venues in Chiba Prefecture
Dai-ichi Life
Sports venues completed in 1988
Sports venues demolished in 2015
1988 establishments in Japan
2015 disestablishments in Japan